The 1876 United States presidential election in South Carolina took place on November 7, 1876, as part of the 1876 United States presidential election. Voters chose 7 representatives, or electors to the Electoral College, who voted for president and vice president.

South Carolina voted for the Republican nominee, Rutherford B. Hayes, over the Democratic nominee, Samuel J. Tilden. Hayes won the state by a very narrow margin of 0.48%, only 889 votes. Events such as the Hamburg massacre served to dissuade many Republican voters. This would be the last time a Republican presidential candidate would win South Carolina until Barry Goldwater carried the state in 1964. Had Tilden won South Carolina, he would have won the election.

Results

References

South Carolina
1876
1876 South Carolina elections